Edwards Creek is a stream in the U.S. state of Washington.

Edwards Creek has the name of an early settler.

See also
List of rivers of Washington

References

Rivers of Okanogan County, Washington
Rivers of Washington (state)